George Lott and Lester Stoefen defeated the defending champions Jean Borotra and Jacques Brugnon in the final, 6–2, 6–3, 6–4 to win the gentlemen's doubles tennis title at the 1934 Wimbledon Championship.

Seeds

  Jean Borotra /  Jacques Brugnon (final)
  George Lott /  Lester Stoefen (champions)
  Pat Hughes /  Fred Perry (second round)
  Jack Crawford /  Adrian Quist (second round)

Draw

Finals

Top half

Section 1

Section 2

Bottom half

Section 3

Section 4

References

External links

Men's Doubles
Wimbledon Championship by year – Men's doubles